A Drag Queen Christmas is a drag tour featuring alumni of RuPaul's Drag Race.

History
The "Return to Order" campaign, led by the American Society for the Defense of Tradition, Family and Property, sought to end the series and cancel a scheduled December 2019 performance at Folly Theatre in Kansas City, Missouri. The campaign gathered 13,000 signatures. Scheduled performers were Aja, Chi Chi DeVayne, Eureka O'Hara, Farrah Moan, Kim Chi, Latrice Royale, Sasha Velour, and Shea Couleé, with Trinity the Tuck hosting.

Tour dates
 November 26, 2017 – Lincoln Theatre, Washington, D.C.
 November 27, 2017 – Dominion Arts Center, Richmond
 December 10, 2017 – Buckhead Theatre, Atlanta
 December 15, 2017 – Orpheum Theatre, Wichita, Kansas
 November 14, 2018 – State Theater, Portland, Maine
 November 25, 2018 – Detroit
 November 30, 2018 – St. Louis
 December 7, 2018 – Denver, Colorado
 December 22, 2018 – House of Blues, Houston, Texas
 November 22, 2019 – Modell Lyric, Baltimore
 November 25, 2019 – College Street Music Hall, New Haven
 December 1, 2019 – St. Louis
 December 3, 2019 – Pantages Theatre, Minneapolis
 December 5, 2019 – Fillmore Auditorium, Denver, Colorado
 December 14, 2019 – Abraham Chavez Theatre, El Paso, Texas
 December 17, 2019 – Folly Theater, Kansas City
 December 19, 2019 – Austin, Texas
 December 28, 2019 – Parker Playhouse, Fort Lauderdale, Florida
 December 29, 2019 – Ferguson Hall, David A. Straz Jr. Center for the Performing Arts, Tampa, Florida

References

External links

 

RuPaul's Drag Race
Drag events